N-Joy (also N-JOY) is a German, public radio station by the Norddeutscher Rundfunk (NDR) made for listeners with an age between 14 and 39. The headquarters is in Hamburg. Program director is Norbert Grundei.

N-Joy started broadcasting on 4 April 1994. The actual program is dominated by charts oriented music, interviews with musicians and unplugged songs. N-Joy does not broadcast any advertisement.

The listeners have the possibility to offer music wishes and to communicate with the moderators via e-mail, Facebook and via telephone. 
The listeners also have the chance to get tickets for "secret concerts" (not public planned concerts of musicians with less security and less visitors).

 

Norddeutscher Rundfunk
Radio stations in Germany
Mass media in Hamburg